Khambewadi is a village in the Karmala taluka of Solapur district in Maharashtra state, India.

Demographics
Covering  and comprising 201 households at the time of the 2011 census of India, Khambewadi had a population of 1031. There were 537 males and 494 females, with 134 people being aged six or younger.

References

Villages in Karmala taluka